The cymenes (methylcumenes, isopropyltoluenes) constitute a group of substances of aromatic hydrocarbons, which structure consists of a benzene ring with an isopropyl group (−CH(CH3)2), and a methyl group (−CH3) as a substituent. Through their different arrangement, they form three structural isomers with the molecular formula C10H14. They also belong to the group of C4-benzenes. The best-known isomer is the p-cymene, it occurs in nature and is one of the terpenes.

References

Alkylbenzenes
C4-Benzenes
Monoterpenes
Isopropyl compounds